Bardwell Creek, an urban watercourse of the Cooks River catchment, is located in the southern suburbs of Sydney, in New South Wales, Australia.

Course and features
Bardwell Creek rises in Georges River local government area, near Hurstville and flows in a north-easterly direction through the suburbs of Bexley, Bexley North, Bardwell Park, and Turrella in the Bayside local government area, where it makes its confluence with Wolli Creek, where it forms the border between the suburbs of Bardwell Park and Turrella. The upper reaches of the Creek are a piped drainage system, which becomes an open concrete channel at Croydon Road in the Bexley Golf Course.

See also

 Bardwell Park, New South Wales
 Bardwell Valley, New South Wales
 Wolli Creek Regional Park

References

External links
 

 

Creeks and canals of Sydney
Cooks River